Marcelle Henriette Marie Villin (born 8 May 1927) is a French composer and organist who publishes her music under the name "Marcelle Villin."

Villin was born in Plomion. She studied music at the Conservatoire de Lille with Kara Chatteley and Edmond Gaujac, and received the Conservatoire's First Prize. Villin later studied at the Collegium Musicum de France and gave organ recitals throughout the United States and France. She was the organist at Sacre Coeur Church in Antibes.

Villin's music has been published by Editions Musicales Transatlantiques, Gerard Billaudot and Henry Lemoine. Her works include:

Chamber 

Badinage (violin and piano)
Chant d'Amour Mystique (violin and organ)
Dans ta Demeur, Seigneur (violin and organ)
Extrait Tuerkesse (violin and piano)
Lui et Elle (violin and piano)
Nos Ames s'Elancent vers Toi, Seigneur Jesus (violin and piano or organ)

Piano/Organ 
Adoration pour une Nuit de Noel (organ)
Alors se Dressant, Il Commanda au Vent et a la Mer
Attente
Elle Court la Micheline
En ce Lieu Savage (etude for left hand)
(L')Espiegle Jongleur
Esquisses de Vacances
Evocations
Fantaisie
Gyoniam Ipsi Consolabuntur
Heures Sylvestres
Loins dans la Montagne
Marche Funebre
Marche Romaine
Meditation Devant un Crucifix (organ)
Mon Chien et Moi
Prelude
Quatuor s'Amuse
Scherzo
Sonate de Noel
Sunt Unum, Melodie pour un Marriage
Theatre d'Enfants, Theme and Variations
Trois Pieces

Theater 

Les Fourberies de Scapin (text by Moliere)

Vocal 

Annonce de Pacques (bass solo and chorus)
Au Christ-roi (cantata; bass solo, tenor solo and chorus)
Ave Maria
Cantum Ergo (chorus and organ)
Chant d'Allegresse pour l'Ascension (chorus)
Deux Melodies (children's chorus)
Dormeuse (lullaby)
Hymne a St. Jeanne d'Arc
Je Crois en Dieu (chorus)
Je Vous Salue Marie (children's chorus)
Jesus en sa Creche (chorus, children's voices and organ)
Kyrie Eleison (chorus)
O Navire Immobile
Pater Noster (bass solo, violin and organ)
Pres d'un Etang (voice and piano)
Six melodies
Tendre Invocations au Sacre Coeur (bass solo and chorus)

References 

French women composers
1927 births
French organists
Living people